Steven Stenger is an American attorney and a former Democratic politician. He served as County Executive of St. Louis County, Missouri from January 2015 to April 2019. He resigned his position in April 2019 after being federally indicted on honest services bribery and mail fraud charges.

Early life and education 
Steve Stenger was born in the St. Louis Hills neighborhood located in southwest St. Louis, but was brought up in Affton, Missouri. His father was a union telephone lineman with Southwestern Bell. Steve Stenger graduated from Bishop DuBourg High School and briefly toured as a singer with two local bands, The Stand and The Painted Faces. Stenger then went to University of Missouri–St. Louis and majored in accounting. After that, he became a certified public accountant (CPA) and went to law school at St. Louis University. After law school, he got a job as a lawyer and CPA at Ernst & Young.

Political career 
Steve Stenger was the prosecuting attorney of a city government from 2005-2008. He was on the St. Louis County Council from 2009 to 2015. He represented the sixth district, which contained about 145,000 people in south St. Louis County. He became Chairman of the Council in 2011.
In 2014, he defeated Charlie Dooley, a long-time incumbent, during the Democratic primaries for St Louis County Executive. He proceeded to win the St. Louis County Executive general election, narrowly edging out his Republican opponent Rick Stream.

He took office as St. Louis County Executive in 2015. Stenger announced his resignation on April 29, 2019, after being federally indicted on three counts of honest services bribery and mail fraud. On May 28, 2019, Stenger was disbarred by the Supreme Court of Missouri. In August 2019, Stenger was sentenced to 46 months in prison and to pay a fine of $250,000. Stenger served his sentence at FPC Yankton and was released to home confinement on June 8, 2021

Electoral history

References

External links 
 Archived campaign website

Year of birth missing (living people)
Living people
American politicians convicted of bribery
American prisoners and detainees
American prosecutors
County executives of St. Louis County, Missouri
Disbarred American lawyers
Ernst & Young people
Missouri Democrats
Missouri politicians convicted of crimes
People from Affton, Missouri
Place of birth missing (living people)
Politicians convicted of honest services fraud
Politicians convicted of mail and wire fraud
Politicians from St. Louis
Prisoners and detainees of the United States federal government
Saint Louis University School of Law alumni
University of Missouri–St. Louis alumni